Khamoshi: The Musical is a 1996 Indian Hindi-language musical romantic drama film. The film was directed by Sanjay Leela Bhansali in his directorial debut. The film stars Nana Patekar, Salman Khan, Manisha Koirala and Seema Biswas. The film is a departure from  signature style of director Sanjay Leela Bhansali’s magnum opus blockbusters and relies heavily on intimate moments which has been described as autobiographical. A box office bomb when released, the film has over the years gained cult following and cited as one of the best musicals of Hindi cinema.

Manisha Koirala's portrayal of Annie, a caring daughter of a deaf-mute couple, was critically praised, and is regarded as one of her finest performances to date. She won several awards for her performance, including the Screen Award for Best Actress and her second consecutive Filmfare Critics Award for Best Actress. Khamoshis narrative is similar to that of the 1996 German film Beyond Silence. Khamoshi was released on 9 August 1996 and Beyond Silence was released on 19 December 1996, more than four months later. The 2014 French film La Famille Bélier and its 2021 American remake CODA also have a similar narrative.

Plot 
The story is about Joseph (Nana Patekar) and Flavy Braganza (Seema Biswas), a deaf couple in Goa. They have a baby girl, Annie (played by Priya Parulekar as young Annie), who is able to speak and hear. A few years later they have another baby, a boy named Sam, who also speaks and hears. Annie's life is divided into two worlds – one with her parents and the other of music, which she loves. Annie gets her musical inspirations from her grandmother, Maria Braganza (Helen).

A few years later, after the tragic death of Sam, Annie's (Manisha Koirala) life is shattered and music and singing fade away. When Annie grows up she gets in touch with music once again – with Raj (Salman Khan) whom she falls in love with. She starts singing again. When Annie gets pregnant, her father tells her to abort the baby because it will dishonor the family. Annie refuses to go against her church and religion. When Joseph learns this, he asks Annie to leave the house. Raj tries to convince Annie's father that he is a nice guy, but Joseph dislikes him mainly because he is a Hindu who doesn't live in Goa, so Annie would have to live far away from him.

Annie marries Raj and gives birth to a boy, whom they name Sam, after her brother. She, Raj, and Sam go to Joseph's house to reconcile with him. Joseph accepts Annie's boy and approves Raj as his son-in-law. Things are really beautiful until their life takes a drastic turn. Annie and Raj have a devastating accident; Annie is seriously injured and goes into a coma. Joseph, Flavy, and Raj try hard to revive her, even trying to stir her emotionally for the sake of Sam. The broken Raj, Joseph's moving mute "speech", and Flavy's love and hope bring Annie back to consciousness.

Cast

 Nana Patekar as Joseph Braganza (Annie's Father)
 Salman Khan as Rajant "Raj" Kashyap
 Manisha Koirala as Annie Braganza
 Seema Biswas as Flavy J. Braganza (Annie's Mother)
 Helen as Maria Braganza (Joseph's Mother and Annie's Grandmother)
 Himani Shivpuri as Neelima Kashyap (Raj's Mother)
 Raghuvir Yadav as Willie

Music

The musical numbers were composed by Jatin–Lalit. The lyrics were written by Majrooh Sultanpuri. The soundtrack topped the music charts in India.

Awards 

 42nd Filmfare Awards:

Won

 Best Film (Critics) – Sanjay Leela Bhansali
 Best Actress (Critics) – Manisha Koirala
 Best Female Playback Singer – Kavita Krishnamurthy for "Aaj Main Upar"
 Best Art Direction – Nitin Chandrakant Desai
 Best Sound Design – Jitendra Chowdhary

Nominated

 Best Film – Polygram Filmed Entertainment
 Best Actor – Nana Patekar
 Best Actress – Manisha Koirala
 Best Supporting Actress – Helen
 Best Supporting Actress – Seema Biswas
 Best Music Director – Jatin–Lalit
 Best Lyricist – Majrooh Sultanpuri for "Aaj Main Upar"
 Best Female Playback Singer – Alka Yagnik for "Baahon Ke Darmiyaan"
1996 Star Screen Awards:
 Best Actress – Manisha Koirala
 Best Supporting Actress – Seema Biswas
 Best Lyricist – Majrooh Sultanpuri for "Aaj Main Upar"
Best Female Playback Singer – Kavita Krishnamurthy for "Aaj Main Upar"

Legacy

The film is considered ahead of its time and rated by many as best work of director Sanjay Leela Bhansali.

References

External links 
 
 Khamoshi: The Musical at Indiafm.com
 Khamoshi Soundtrack on Amazon.com
 Khamoshi Soundtrack

1996 films
1990s Hindi-language films
1996 directorial debut films
Films directed by Sanjay Leela Bhansali
Films scored by Jatin–Lalit
Films set in Goa
Indian musical drama films
Films about blind people in India
Films shot in Goa
Indian Sign Language films